Cormocephalus inermis is a species of centipede in the Scolopendridae family. It is endemic to Australia, and was first described in 1916 by German naturalist Karl Kraepelin, following the collection of specimen material by Swedish zoologist Eric Mjöberg.

Distribution
The species is found in the Gulf region of northern Queensland.

Behaviour
The centipedes are solitary terrestrial predators that inhabit plant litter, soil and rotting wood.

References

 

 
inermis
Centipedes of Australia
Endemic fauna of Australia
Fauna of Queensland
Animals described in 1916
Taxa named by Karl Kraepelin